was a legendary local ruler of Okinawa Island. He succeeded his father, Tamagusuku, in 1336, at the age of ten. His reign is characterized by the meddling of his mother in government affairs, and her corruption. The king's mother took advantage of her privileges and position, and severely damaged popular support for her son.

Seii died in 1349. The ruler of Urasoe, Satto, seized power for himself.

Notes

References
 Kerr, George H. (1965). Okinawa, the History of an Island People. Rutland, Vermont: C.E. Tuttle Co. OCLC  39242121
  (2002). . Naha: Okinawa Bunka-sha. OCLC 170411659 (1997 ed.)

1328 births
1349 deaths
Kings of Ryūkyū
14th-century Ryukyuan people